Hurrà Juventus, formerly known as HJ Magazine is an Italian sport magazine entirely dedicated to the football club Juventus F.C. Founded by Editor and first director Corradino Corradini during the club's Presidential Committee of War composed by Gioacchino Armano (one of the founders), Sandro Zambelli and Fernando Nizza (a former Juventus footballer), was first published at Turin on 10 June 1915 as a newspaper to distribute among club's players, workers and fans in World War I.

The oldest publication of its kind in the country was discontinued in October 1916, due to lack of raw materials as consequence of the World War I, but the prints again in 1919 until 1927.

Hurrà Juventus is currently the best selling football club magazine in Italy (60,000 copies monthly). The magazine is published by Cantelli Editore S.p.A.

See also
List of magazines published in Italy

References

Juventus F.C.
Magazines established in 1915
Association football magazines
Sports mass media in Italy
Magazines published in Turin
Sports magazines
Monthly magazines published in Italy
Italian-language magazines
1915 establishments in Italy